Refused (also known as the Refused) is a Swedish hardcore punk band originating from Umeå and formed in 1991. Refused is composed of vocalist Dennis Lyxzén, guitarist Kristofer Steen, drummer David Sandström, and bassist Magnus Flagge. Guitarist Jon Brännström was a member from 1994, through reunions, until he was fired in late-2014. Their lyrics are often of a non-conformist and politically far-left nature and were for a time associated with the straight edge subculture.

The band released their debut album This Just Might Be... the Truth in 1994. They followed this up with Songs to Fan the Flames of Discontent (1996) and five EPs. In 1998, the band released The Shape of Punk to Come, which expanded their sound with jazz and electronic influences, but was initially poorly received commercially and critically. The group shortly after disbanded during their subsequent tour. Despite limited contemporary success, Refused were influential on the development of rock music in subsequent decades.

In 2012, the band reformed and commenced a reunion tour, and later released further albums Freedom (2015) and War Music (2019).

History

Early years (1991–1997)

Refused formed in early 1991  with Dennis Lyxzén (former frontman of the straight edge band Step Forward) on vocals, David Sandström on drums, Pär Hansson on guitar, and Jonas Lindgren on bass. They formed with the aim of playing outside of their hometown and releasing a 7" record (the latter which never happened). They released their first demo, Refused, the same year. With an already altered lineup (including Kristofer Steen joining from local band Abhinanda with Pär Hansson going the other way) the band released their first studio album, This Just Might Be... the Truth, in 1994. A month later, they released the Everlasting EP.

Refused's final line-up consisted of Dennis Lyxzén, David Sandström, Kristofer Steen, and Jon Brännström, but the band never found a permanent bass player, switching up to 12 bassists until their original break-up. In June 1996, they released Songs to Fan the Flames of Discontent through Victory Records. The album had a style that steered towards the metallic hardcore genre and included a fanzine explaining their political ideas. For this record, they toured with Snapcase. Later on, they did it in support of Millencolin in the United States and with Mindjive in Europe.

The Shape of Punk to Come and disbandment (1998)
Their third album, 1998's The Shape of Punk to Come, incorporated diverse sounds outside of the strict hardcore realm, such as electronica, jazz, and ambient. Initially, the album was both a commercial and critical failure, with little media coverage and mixed reception from fans and critics alike; some even refused to rate it because of its stylistic divergence.

The United States tour to support the album was cancelled halfway. They were joined by Washington, D.C.'s Frodus and only completed eight shows in half-empty basements and coffeehouses, finishing in a chaotic performance in a basement of Harrisonburg, Virginia that, after four songs, was shut down by police. They described these concerts as "emotionally devastating" and "an awful experience", which finally led to their break-up after a rough internal fight in Atlanta, Georgia. Other factors to their disbandment were a depletion of creative energy and band members wanting different things. There was also conflict between Dennis and the rest of the band.

Refused announced their demise through a strongly-worded open letter titled "Refused Are Fucking Dead" on their label Burning Heart's website.

After breakup (1999–2009)
The story of Refused's last show soon became popular, as well as The Shape of Punk to Come. A year after its release, the album shot up from 1,400 to 21,000 units sold in the United States. In 2000, it went up to 28,000. From then on, many notable artists started to praise the band and newcomers cited them as an influence.

Lead singer Dennis Lyxzén went on to form The (International) Noise Conspiracy soon thereafter, while the other members, as well as venturing into their own projects, formed the group TEXT.

In 2007 Lyxzén and Sandström briefly reformed their Refused side project, Final Exit, which existed in the mid-late 1990s and originally consisted of members of Refused and Abhinanda, with each member taking a different role to that which they had in their main bands (e.g., David on vocals and Dennis on bass guitar).

As of May 2008, Dennis Lyxzén and David Sandström formed a new straightforward hardcore band under the name AC4.

Kristofer Steen moved to Orange County, California and attended film school there. He made a documentary on the band's last year in existence called Refused Are Fucking Dead, which was released in 2006. Then, he began working on operas in Sweden.

Rumours (2010–2011)
In March 2010, Epitaph Records put up the old Refused website online with the words "Coming Soon." Rumours spread across the Internet about what the new website could indicate, including speculation of a reunion. Citing an anonymous source "close to the situation," Punknews.org unofficially announced that the band would perform at European music festivals in 2010.  Dennis Lyxzén denied claims of a Refused reformation as he and David Sandström were busy with AC4. The new band website was later announced to be a promotional site for a reissue of Refused's final album, The Shape of Punk to Come. The reissue, released on 8 June 2010, is a three-disc set with an unreleased live album recorded in 1998 and the Refused Are Fucking Dead DVD documentary in addition to the full original album.

In November 2011, multiple posters said to be for the upcoming 2012 Coachella Festival appeared on several Internet sites, and the line-ups included Refused. This started new rumours of a long-awaited reunion.

Reunion (2012)

During BBC Radio 1's "Punk Show" on 2 January 2012, Mike Davies stated that Refused, along with At the Drive-In would be reforming in 2012. On 9 January 2012, it was announced that Refused would be performing for the 2012 Coachella Festival. The reunion was confirmed via Dennis Lyxzén's Facebook page. This was highly contested considering the band's original and explicit declaration to never reunite. Later that day, it was announced that they would also be playing at Way Out West Festival in Gothenburg, Sweden. They also headlined the Groezrock festival in Belgium. The confirmation that Refused would be UK exclusives at Sonisphere Festival in the UK was made on 20 February. However, in light of Sonisphere UK's subsequent cancellation, Refused were officially booked by Download Festival on 3 April, to perform at Donington Park instead. On 29 February, Refused played a secret show in Umeå, their first live performance since 1998. Refused were also confirmed for the Rock for People festival in Czech Republic. They appeared for the first time on TV in America on Late Night with Jimmy Fallon on 18 July 2012.

On 23 August 2012 Refused indicated by a Facebook post that their reunion was for 2012 only and not a continuation of their career. On 24 August 2012, it was announced that Refused would undertake a theatre tour of Australia for the first time ever that November. The after party for Refused's show on 15 December 2012 in Fabriken, Umeå saw brief reunions from related Umeå hardcore bands Abhinanda and Final Exit, as well as some rarely performed songs from Refused. Redd Kross also performed on the evening.

Hiatus, second reunion, and Freedom (2013–2017)
On 22 February 2013, Refused were awarded "The special prize for Swedish music exports" by the Minister of Trade.  Lyxzén and Sandström chose to criticize the current Government at the ceremony, instead thanking the efforts of popular education, in particular Workers' Educational Association (ABF) and youth centers (in Sweden associated with social democracy) while Jon Brännström chose to not accept the prize on his behalf later stating he wished they "[...] had said no to the prize and instead held a press conference about why we had turned it down".

On 31 October 2014, Jon Brännström stated on the official Refused Facebook page that he had been fired from the band (the band would later state that he left the band in 2013), implying that Refused were still active and planned on performing again in the future. On 25 November 2014, the band announced that they would perform their first shows in three years at the Reading and Leeds Festivals, Groezrock and Amnesia Rockfest in the summer of 2015. They also headlined Punk Rock Bowling in Las Vegas in May 2015. Around the same time, rumours surfaced of a new album being recorded for release in 2015 after ...And You Will Know Us By the Trail of Dead's Autrey Fulbright II posted a photo on Instagram claiming that Lyxzén had been in the studio recording vocals for the album.

On 27 April 2015, it was announced that Refused would release their fourth studio album, Freedom, in June 2015 via Epitaph Records. The album was produced by Nick Launay and includes further collaborations such as two songs produced with Max Martin-collaborator Shellback (Taylor Swift). The news was announced along with the release of the album's opening track, "Elektra," as its lead single.

On 20 November 2017, members of Refused revealed on social media that the band has been in the studio working on their next album.

Servants of Death, Cyberpunk 2077 and War Music (2018–present)
In May 2018, the band released the Servants of Death EP which contained a new song, a b-side and four live songs. It was originally released on vinyl in 2016 as part of Record Store Day.

On 2 July 2019, it was announced that Refused would be partnering with video game developer CD Projekt Red, creating and recording original music for then-upcoming video game Cyberpunk 2077. The members of Refused provided music for a fictitious band in the in-game universe, punk rock group SAMURAI; which includes fictitious musician and terrorist Johnny Silverhand, portrayed and voiced by Keanu Reeves; while Lyxzén provided vocals on the music tracks for both Johnny and Kerry Eurodyne. The announcement was made alongside the release of Chippin' In on streaming services, the first single to be revealed for the project. 
On 23 August 2019, a new song called Never Fade Away came out.

On 2 August 2019, the band released "Blood Red" from their forthcoming album War Music. The album was released on October 18 of that year, followed by a UK tour alongside Thrice and Gouge Away. 

Five-track EP The Malignant Fire was released on 20 November 2020. It featured single Born On The Outs, three other new songs, as well as Malfire from War Music.

Musical style, lyrics and influences
Refused started as a "fresh-faced positive hardcore band" and their music became increasingly progressive and radical, as did their lyrics. The record This Just Might Be... the Truth was characterized for its "massive hardcore sound", mostly influenced by various bands from the New York hardcore scene (such as Earth Crisis). On their follow-up, Songs to Fan the Flames of Discontent, the band had a heavier, more intricate style, which is generally attributed to their Slayer inspiration, and Lyxzén adopted screaming vocals rather than shouting. With the third album, The Shape of Punk to Come, "came the leap into the unknown" as the band mixed their previous style with unorthodox chord progressions, sampling, "ambient textures, jazz breakdowns", electronica and monologues, and other deviations from the hardcore punk music.

Refused's lyrics focus on far-left politics, drawing on anarchism, socialism, among other ideologies. By the time of their first album, the band already had a strong anti-establishment profile. The group's members were all vegan straight edge until their last show in 1998 and a couple of their songs dealt with these topics. Today, some of them no longer follow these lifestyles. In their live performances, vocalist Lyxzén usually delivers political speeches between songs. Before the Umeå hardcore phenomenon went into full bloom, the band was seen as part of the scene centered around youth-oriented venue Galaxen, along with the punk-rock scene as well as metal bands such as Meshuggah.

Among the biggest influences of Refused were ManLiftingBanner, Born Against, Slayer, and Ian Svenonius's projects (The Make-Up, The Nation of Ulysses and Cupid Car Club). Other bands that have influenced them are Fugazi, Inside Out, and Snapcase.

Legacy
Refused profoundly affected the development of rock music at the turn of the twenty-first century, despite the fact that very few people supported them when they were active. According to Vice, they "stood at the nexus of modern punk, incorporating all of its subgenres into one scattered but neat package", putting "the risk back into punk and hardcore by making it unexpected again." David Anthony of The A.V. Club described The Shape of Punk to Come as "an undisputed classic that served as a rallying cry for bands longing to incorporate sounds from outside the walls of aggressive music." Author Gabriel Kuhn states that Refused "became the flagship of a remarkably strong vegan straight edge movement that engulfed Sweden throughout the 1990s" with "witty manifestos" and "performances" that "challenged many of the scene's standards".

Among the artists who cite Refused as an influence are Linkin Park, Duff McKagan of Velvet Revolver and Guns N' Roses, Sum 41, Tom DeLonge and Mark Hoppus of Blink-182, AFI, Papa Roach, Tim McIlrath of Rise Against, Underoath, Enter Shikari, the Used, Every Time I Die, Norma Jean, Showbread, La Dispute, Nick Hipa of As I Lay Dying, Derek E. Miller of Poison the Well and Sleigh Bells, Geoff Rickly of Thursday, United Nations and No Devotion, Marcos Curiel of P.O.D. and Daylight Division, Jeremy Bolm of Hesitation Wounds and Touché Amoré, Zachary Garren of Dance Gavin Dance and Strawberry Girls, Chris Teti of the World Is a Beautiful Place & I Am No Longer Afraid to Die, the New Transit Direction, the Bloody Beetroots, Justin Beck of Glassjaw and Sons of Abraham, Robin Staps of the Ocean, the Bled, Thomas Williams of Stray from the Path, Brandon Kellum of American Standards, and Jonathan Boulet. The song "H. Ledger" from letlive.'s album Fake History is a "homage" to Refused because the band felt that they "didn't receive proper recognition until they were no longer active." British musician Frank Turner stated that The Shape of Punk to Come "shaped my musical path as a musician for a long time" and his group, Million Dead, took their name from a line in the Refused's song "The Apollo Programme was a Hoax". Pop punk band Paramore were inspired by the song "Liberation Frequency" and quoted a line of it on their 2007 song "Born for This".

Other artists have been quoted expressing admiration for their work are Anthrax, Steve Aoki, and Ben Weinman of the Dillinger Escape Plan.

Members

Current members
Dennis Lyxzén — lead vocals (1991–1998, 2012, 2014-present)
David Sandström — drums (1991–1998, 2012, 2014-present)
Kristofer Steen — guitars (1994–1998, 2012, 2014-present); bass (1994–1998, in studio)
Magnus Flagge (formerly Björklund) — bass (1992–1995, 2014–present; touring 1997, 2012), 
Mattias Bärjed — guitar (2019–present; touring member 2015–2019)

Former members
 Jonas Lidgren — bass (1991-1992)
 Pär Hansson — guitars (1991–1994)
 Henrik Jansson — guitars (1992–1995)
 Jon Brännström — guitars, samples, synthesizer, backing vocals (1995–1998, 2012)
 Magnus Höggren — bass (1995–1997)
 Ulf Nybérg — bass (1997–1998)

Session bassists
 Jesper Sundberg (1994)
 Anders Johansson (1994–1995, whenever needed)
 Jonas "Babyface" Eriksson (1996–1997, also took part in the pre-production of The Shape of Punk to Come)
 Håkan-Håkan Strandhag (1997; needed once)
 Inge Johansson (1997; needed once)
 Andreas Nilsson (1997; needed once)
 Don Devore (1998; US tour)

Timeline

Discography

Studio albums
 This Just Might Be... the Truth (1994)
 Songs to Fan the Flames of Discontent (1996)
 The Shape of Punk to Come (1998)
 Freedom (2015)
 War Music (2019)

See also
Animal rights and punk subculture

References

Bibliography

External links

 
 
 

 
Swedish hardcore punk groups
Post-hardcore groups
Experimental rock groups
Straight edge groups
Equal Vision Records artists
Burning Heart Records artists
Victory Records artists
1991 establishments in Sweden
Musical groups established in 1991
Musical groups disestablished in 1998
Musical groups reestablished in 2012
Musical groups disestablished in 2012
Musical groups reestablished in 2014